Susan or Sue Brown may refer to:

 Susan Brown (mathematician) (1937–2017), British professor of mathematics
 L. Susan Brown (born 1959), Canadian anarcha-feminist writer
 Susan Brown (minister) (born 1958), Scottish minister
 Susan Brown (English actress) (born 1946)
 Susan Brown (American actress) (1932–2018)
 Susan E. Brown, American medical anthropologist and nutritionist
 Sue Brown (cricketer) (born 1958), New Zealand cricketer
 Sue Brown (rowing) (born 1958), first woman to take part in The Boat Race (Oxford cox in 1981 and 1982)
 Sue Ellen Brown (born 1954), American artist
 Sue K. Brown (born 1948), American ambassador to Montenegro
 Sue M. Wilson Brown (1877–1941), African-American activist for women's suffrage
 Susan Brown (judge), judge of the Supreme Court of Queensland, Australia